Solenophora is a genus of flowering plants in the family Gesneriaceae, native to Central America and southern Mexico. Most of its species have limited, local distributions, but Solenophora calycosa is widespread.

Species
Currently accepted species include:

Solenophora abietorum Standl. & Steyerm.
Solenophora calycosa Donn.Sm.
Solenophora chiapasensis D.N.Gibson
Solenophora coccinea Benth.
Solenophora endlicheriana (C.Heller ex Fenzl) Hanst.
Solenophora erubescens Donn.Sm.
Solenophora glomerata Weigend & Förther
Solenophora insignis (M.Martens & Galeotti) Hanst.
Solenophora maculata D.N.Gibson
Solenophora modesta Weigend & Förther
Solenophora obliqua Denham & D.N.Gibson
Solenophora obscura Hanst.
Solenophora pirana C.V.Morton
Solenophora purpusii Brandegee
Solenophora schleehaufii Weigend & Förther
Solenophora tuerckheimiana Donn.Sm.
Solenophora tuxtlensis Ram.-Roa & Ibarra-Manr.
Solenophora wilsonii Standl.

References

Gesneriaceae genera
Gesnerioideae